Uritskoye is a rural locality (a selo) and the administrative center of Uritsky Rural Okrug in Olyokminsky District of the Sakha Republic, Russia, located  from Olyokminsk, the administrative center of the district. Its population as of the 2010 Census was 304, down from 329 recorded during the 2002 Census.

References

Notes

Sources
Official website of the Sakha Republic. Registry of the Administrative-Territorial Divisions of the Sakha Republic. Olyokminsky District. 

Rural localities in Olyokminsky District